In the spring of 1989, the Seven-Party (Afghanistan mujahideen) Union in Peshawar supported by the Pakistani intelligence agency ISI attacked Jalalabad. The ISI's Director Gul wanted to see a mujahideen government over Afghanistan, led by Hekmatyar.

Analysts disagree as to whether Pakistan's Prime Minister Benazir Bhutto was totally kept in the dark about the ISI's plan to overturn Afghanistan or was one of the instigators of this attack. One analyst stated that also United States Ambassador to Pakistan Robert B. Oakley was exhortating this mujahideen attack. The Americans reportedly were motivated by their wish to humiliate the Marxists and send them out of Afghanistan "clinging to their helicopters", thus avenge the fall of South Vietnam; Pakistan wished to retaliate against the Soviet Union as the latter had long unconditionally supported Pakistan's regional rival, India.

Battle begins 
Involved in the operation were forces of Hekmatyar's Hezb-e Islami Gulbuddin, Abdul Rasul Sayyaf's Ittehad-e Islami and Arab fighters, totalling 10,000 men. The attack began on March 5, 1989, and went well at first for the mujahideen, who captured the Jalalabad airfield before being counterattacked. When government troops started to surrender, however, they, along with unarmed civilians, were tortured and executed by Hekmatyar's and Sayyaf's forces, making the option of surrender impossible for the communists who then fought harder. Consequently, the attacking forces were soon blocked by the main Afghan army positions held by the 11th Division, that were protected by bunkers, barbed wire and minefields. The government troops could count on intensive air support, as the Afghan air force flew 20 sorties a day over the battlefield. An-12 transport aircraft, modified to carry bombs, flew at high altitude out of range of the Stinger missiles used by the mujahideen; cluster bombs were used intensively.

Three Scud firing batteries, deployed around Kabul, fired more than 400 missiles in support of the Jalalabad garrison. Despite their imprecision, these weapons had a severe effect on the morale of the mujahideen, who could do nothing to prevent them. By the middle of May, they had made no headway against the defences of Jalalabad, and were running low on ammunition. In July, they were unable to prevent the Afghan Army from recapturing Samarkhel, and Jalalabad was still firmly in the hands of Najibullah's government. The mujahideen suffered an estimated 3,000 casualties during this battle. An estimated 12,000–15,000 civilians were killed, while 10,000 had fled the fighting.

Aftermath 
Contrary to American and Pakistani expectations, this battle proved that the Afghan Army could fight without Soviet help, and greatly increased the confidence of government supporters. Conversely, the morale of the mujahideen involved in the attack slumped and many local commanders of Hekmatyar and Sayyaf concluded truces with the government. In the words of Brigadier-General Mohammed Yousaf, an officer of the ISI, "the jihad never recovered from Jalalabad". In particular of course Pakistan's plans to promote Hekmatyar were also harmed. Both the Pakistani and the American governments were frustrated with the outcome. As a result of this failure, General Hamid Gul was immediately sacked by Pakistani Prime Minister Benazir Bhutto, and replaced with General Shamsur Rahman Kallu as the Director-General of the ISI. Kallu pursued a more classical policy of support to the Afghan guerillas. In this respect he cut off the barrier that his predecessors, Akhtar Abdur Rahman and Gul had placed between the mujahideen and the American secret service, which for the first time had direct access to the mujahedeen. The former Pakistani spies, such as Gul, had argued that this gave the United States an opportunity to both undercut Pakistan's interests as well as to weave discord among the mujahideen (something which Pakistan's promotion of Hekmatyar had of course done as well).

Indeed, with direct American access to the mujahideen – in particular that of the envoy Peter Tomsen, whose attitude towards independent Afghans was arrogant and arguably hostile in that he deemed them dangerous extremists without direct US supervision – any segment of mujahideen unity crumbled. Traditionally independent mujahideen leaders, such as Yunus Khalis, Jalaluddin Haqqani, who had tried to unite the mujahideen rivals Massoud and Hekmatyar, now moved closer towards Pakistan because of their suspicion of the United States' intentions. (See also Haqqani network). Others, like Abdul Haq and Massoud, instead favoured the United States because of their tense relations with Pakistan. While Abdul Haq remained hostile towards the communist government and its militias, Massoud would go on to make controversial alliances with former communist figures. Massoud claimed that this was an attempt to unite Afghanistan, but his enemies such as Hekmatyar attacked him for this. Hekmatyar's push were also supported by Pakistan, so that by 1990 there was a definite (if loose) pair of competing axes – one promoted by Pakistan and including Hekmatyar, but also other mujahidin leaders such as Khalis, Jalaluddin Haqqani and other mujahideen leaders who were unsympathetic to Hekmatyar – and the other promoted by the United States and led by Massoud, but also including other leaders such as Abdul Haq who were unsympathetic to Massoud.

The government forces further proved their worth in April 1990, during an offensive against a fortified complex at Paghman. After a heavy bombardment and an assault that lasted until the end of June, the Afghan Army, spearheaded by Dostum's militia, was able to clear the mujahideen entrenchments.

Domestic criticism 
The Jalalabad operation was seen as a grave mistake by some mujahideen leaders such as Ahmad Shah Massoud and Abdul Haq, who did not believe the mujahideen had the capacity to capture a major city in conventional warfare. Neither Massoud nor Haq had participated in the attack on Jalalabad. Massoud even said it was by BBC radio that he learned about the operation. Haq advocated the pursuit of coordinated guerilla warfare, that would gradually weaken the communist regime and cause its collapse through internal divisions. Abdul Haq was also quoted as asking: "How is that we Afghans, who never lost a war, must take military instructions from the Pakistanis, who never won one?" Ahmad Shah Massoud criticized the go-it-alone attitude of Pakistan and their Afghan followers stating: "The damage caused by our (Mujahideen forces) lack of a unified command is obvious. There is a total lack of coordination, which means we are not launching simultaneous offensives on different fronts. As a result, the government can concentrate its resources and pick us off one by one. And that is what has happened at Jalalabad."

References 

1989
20th century in Afghanistan
1989 in Afghanistan
Cold War conflicts
Rebellions in Asia
Communism-based civil wars
Soviet–Afghan War
Afghan Civil War (1989-1992)